Cent briques et des tuiles is a 1965 French film directed by Pierre Grimblat.

Synopsis 

Marcel, a small-time gangster, has lost all his gang's proceeds, 20 million francs, while gambling. His accomplices, the Shultz brothers, throw him out of his apartment and give him a week to come up with the money. Marcel goes to Champs Elysées, there crossing paths with his old friend Étienne, who proposes a robbery of the Galeries Lafayette store, telling Marcel it should net them 100 million francs. Étienne and Marcel (possibly a reference to Étienne Marcel) join forces with Justin, who disguises himself as Santa Claus. With the aid of the shop's lift boy, the heist is a success, but the banknotes are soaked in water, setting off the gang's troubles.

A group of young street criminals unsuccessfully trying to rob a neighbourhood shop run into Justin and take the money. At the end of a chain of bizarre events, Marcel's gang takes the money from the young criminals after the latter have a car accident. However, they're faced with a new problem: separating the bills which have dried up and stuck together like bricks. The gang tries to solve the problem by boiling them and drying again.

Cast
 Jean-Claude Brialy as Marcel
 Marie Laforêt as Ida
 Sophie Daumier as Moune
 Jean-Pierre Marielle as Justin
 Michel Serrault as Méloune
 Albert Rémy as Etienne
 Pierre Clémenti as Raf
 Daniel Ceccaldi as Léon 
 Robert Manuel as Palmoni
 Dominique Davray as Poulaine
 Renaud Verley as Charles
 Bernard Fresson as Policeman
 Paul Préboist as The Cousin

External links
 

1965 films
1960s French-language films
French heist films
1960s heist films
1960s French films